Nathan Wayne Hill (born July 8, 1979) is an American historical linguist and Tibetologist specializing in languages of the Sino-Tibetan family, in particular Tibetic languages.

He is Sam Lam Professor in Chinese Studies and Director of the Trinity Centre for Asian Studies at Trinity College Dublin.
He was previously Reader in Tibetan and Historical Linguistics at SOAS, East Asian Languages and Cultures, and served as Head of Department from 2017 to 2019.

He is particularly well-known for his work on comparative Sino-Tibetan, Old Tibetan philology, as well as linguistic typology (especially mirativity and evidentiality).

From 2014 to 2020, Hill was a principal investigator on Beyond Boundaries: Religion, Region, Language and the State, a project funded by the European Research Council and hosted by the British Museum. During the academic year 2015–2016 he was a visiting professor at the University of California, Berkeley, and in 2020–2021 at Oxford's Oriental Institute.

Works

References

External links

 SOAS web page
 Academia.edu profile
 Google Scholar citations
 'Why Does Tibetan Stack its Letters' (YouTube)
 'Sino-Tibetan Languages Introduction and Historical Perspective' (YouTube)
 'Current research themes in Sino-Tibetan comparative linguistics' (YouTube)
 'Methods in Sino-Tibetan linguistics' (YouTube)

Linguists from the United States
Tibetologists
Living people
1979 births
Harvard University alumni
Historical linguists